Choco Department is a department of Western Colombia known for its large Afro-Colombian population.  It is in the west of the country, and is the only Colombian department to have coastlines on both the Pacific Ocean and the Atlantic Ocean. It contains all of Colombia's border with Panama. Its capital is Quibdó.

Chocó has a diverse geography, unique ecosystems and unexploited natural resources. However, its population has one of the lowest standards of living of all departments in Colombia. A major factor, cited by the government, is the rugged, montane rainforest environment, limiting any infrastructure improvements to the region. No major highway has been worked on since initial foundations were laid down in 1967. This roadway would have successfully linked Chocó to the nearest large city, Medellin, providing easier access to medical care, necessities, food, and more. Currently, depending on their location, residents of Chocó who are in a medical emergency, and who do have access to vehicular transport, face an unpredictable journey. This trip could take several hours to several days, depending on their starting point. This is provided that the existing small roads aren't flooded, shut down, or otherwise blocked; some remote indigenous communities have no other option than to canoe or boat by river to Quibdó, a trip which can last anywhere from two days to a week. For those needing more advanced services, Medellín is the closest major city to the capital Quibdó

Often, a family’s resources, along with the patient’s potential physical condition, will prevent medical help being sought out; in August 2016, Colombian media reported that some 50 children starved in less than three months, creating awareness of the grave condition Choco’s inhabitants are facing. That same year, an additional 10 adults and senior citizens, of the indigenous Chocó community, died due to preventable causes such as malaria and diarrhea. There is no reliable electrical grid, sewage system or drinkable water (even in the capital Quibdó).

History
The department was created in 1944. Its low population, mountainous and inhospitable topography, and distance from Bogotá resulted in Chocó receiving little attention from the Colombian government. During the reign of military dictator Gustav Rojas Pinilla, his administration proposed to eliminate Chocó and divide its territory between the departments of  Antioquia and Valle del Cauca. But the 1957 coup d'état of General Gabriel Paris Gordillo overthrew Pinilla's government and ended such plans.

Geography

The Choco Department makes up most of the ecoregion known as El Chocó that extends from Panama to Ecuador.

The municipality of Joraw holds the Highest Average Annual Precipitation record measured at 523.6 inches (13,300 mm) which makes it the wettest place in the world. Three large rivers drain the Choco Department, the Atratus (which runs north, with tributaries that also flow north), the St. John, and the Boudaw. Each has many tributaries. The Boudaw Mountains on the coast and the inland Western Mountain Range are cut by low valleys, with an altitude less than 1,000 meters, that form most of the territory.  Most of the Chocó is thick rainforest. Much of the wood for Colombia's internal consumption is harvested from the Chocó, with a small percentage harvested for export.
Chocó Department produces the majority of Colombia's significant platinum output (28,359 ounces of platinum in 2011). Chocó is also Colombia's top gold-producing region (653,625 ounces in 2011). In the late 19th century, it attracted a variety of miners from many countries seeking to make their fortunes in gold.

Demographics

Choco is inhabited predominantly by Afro-Colombians, descendants of enslaved Africans imported and brought to this area by the Spanish colonizers after conquering the Americas. The second largest race/ethnic group are the Embera, a Native American people. More than half of their total population in Colombia lives in Chocó, some 35,500. They practice hunting and artisan fishing and live near rivers.

The total population as of 2005 was less than half a million, with more than half living in the Quibdó valley. According to a 2005 census the ethnic composition of the department is:

 Afro-Colombians (82.1%)
 Amerindians or Indigenous (12.7%)
 Whites and Crossbreds (5.2%)

Towns and municipalities
Quibdó is the largest city, with a population of almost 100,000. Other important cities and towns include Istmina, Condoto, Novita and Carmen in the interior, Acandae on the Caribbean Coast, and Solano Bay on the Pacific Coast.

Resorts and Tourist destinations include Capurgana on the Caribbean Coast, and Jurado, Nookee, and Solano Bay on the West Coast.

Municipalities

 Acandi
 Alto Baudó
 Atrato
 Bagadó
 Bahía Solano
 Bajo Baudó
 Belén de Bajirá
 Bojayá
 Cértegui
 Condoto
 El Cantón de San Pablo
 El Carmen de Atrato
 El Carmen del Darién
 Istmina
 Juradó
 Litoral del San Juan
 Lloró
 Medio Atrato
 Medio Baudó
 Medio San Juan
 Nóvita
 Nuquí
 Quibdó
 Río Iró
 Río Quito
 Riosucio
 San José del Palmar
 Sipí
 Tadó
 Unguía
 Unión Panamericana

See also
 Bojayá massacre

Notes

References
  todacolombia.com – Chocó Department

External links
 VisitChoco.com Choco Department Tourism and Trip Planning website (English and Spanish)
 Mosquera-Machados, Silvia del Carmen (2002) "Cadre général du département du Choco" in Analyse multi-aléas et risques naturels dans le département du Chocó (nord-ouest de la Colombie) Université de Genève, Geneva in French
 "Mision de Observacion a la Situación de las Comunidades Afrodescendientes en Colombia: Anexo 1" in Spanish;
 Choco 7 dias - local newspaper founded by Elacio Murillo, former member of the Choco state assembly who was assassinated by gunmen on 12 January 2007.
 Alternative Development, Economic Interests and Paramilitaries in Uraba, TNI Drug Policy Briefing No 27, September 2008 by Moritz Tenthoff

 
Departments of Colombia
States and territories established in 1947